All My Sons may refer to:

All My Sons, a 1947 play by Arthur Miller
All My Sons (film), a 1948 film based on the play of the same name
All My Sons, a 2010 album by Down to Nothing